French basketball club Élan Béarnais history and statistics in FIBA Europe and Euroleague Basketball competitions.

European competitions

References

Basketball teams in France